The Naval Shipyards were naval shipbuilding facilities used by the Provincial Marine and the Royal Navy in York, Upper Canada (present day Toronto). The naval shipyards were ordered by the Lieutenant Governor of Upper Canada John Graves Simcoe in 1793, and were opened in 1798.

History
The shipyards were called for by Lieutenant Governor John Graves Simcoe in 1793  and operated from 1798. The shipyards were situated on Humber Bay, near the western edge of the settlement (east of the ruins of Fort Rouille) and located south of Front Street on the shores of Lake Ontario west of Bay Street (today this is where the rail tracks south of Union Station are located). Ships were built along the sand shores using the trees from the forests inland and launched into Toronto Bay.

Several ships were built for the Provincial Marine and the Royal Navy during the 1810s, including  the schooner Prince Regent in 1812 (later renamed HMS Beresford in 1813, as HMS Netley 1814 and finally base ship HMS Niagara; broken up 1843). 

During the Battle of York, Major General Roger Hale Sheaffe dispatched Captain Tito LeLievre of the Royal Newfoundland Fencibles to the naval dockyards to set fire to the incomplete sloop-of-war . After the Battle of York, a naval squadron was stationed at York, and assisted with transporting wounded soldiers from the Niagara front to the medical hospital established at Fort York. However, although private shipbuilding resumed in York, the naval yards did not build any other navy ships after 1813 and abandoned and likely moved to a safer and more protected location in Kingston Royal Naval Dockyard.

Post-military history

Numerous builders at mouth of Rouge River 1810–1856 
After the War of 1812, shipbuilding yards in Toronto were typically held in private hands. Cooper's Wharf slip was another early 19th century shipbuilder in Toronto and remained in operations until 1845.

Polson Iron Works Limited was established in Toronto in 1883, was a major builder of steamers into the 1900s. Located at the foot of Sherbourne Street, Polson produced around 150 assorted vessels, including ten steel-hulled minesweepers for the Royal Canadian Navy and Royal Navy, and  six cargo vessels during World War I. The company declared bankruptcy shortly after the end of the war and closed in 1919.

Several other ship builders were also based at the Bathurst Street Wharf. They include:
 Doty Engine Works 1890 new shipyard at Lakeshore and Spadina 
 Bertram Engineering Works 1893 Doty yard changes owners  
 Canadian Shipbuilding Company 1905 – acquired Bertram site but company fails by 1908
 Toronto Shipyards 1908 – took over from Canadian Shipbuilding and remains in operations until 1910
 Thor Iron Works 1913 – acquire vacant Toronto Shipyards 
 Dominion Shipbuilding and Repair Company Limited 1917 – renamed from Thor and operated at both Spadina Avenue and Bathurst Street as well as Keating Channel building mostly cargo ships for Canadian and overseas buyers as well as yacht Oriole IV which later became HMCS Oriole; folded 1920 after strike with last two ships completed by Collingwood Shipyards

World War II

In the 20th century, shipbuilding activity remained dormant (other than Toronto Drydock Company) until the start of World War II with demand for war ships. Several shipbuilding enterprises emerged including:

 Dufferin Shipbuilding Company 1940 – acquires Keating Channel site from the former Dominion Shipbuilding site
 Toronto Shipbuilding Company 1941 – renamed from Dufferin after take over by the Canadian government
 Redfern Construction Company 1943 – renamed from Toronto Shipbuilding and closed 1945

See also
 Provincial Marine
 Navy Island Royal Naval Shipyard
 Amherstburg Royal Naval Dockyard
 Kingston Royal Naval Dockyard

References

 List of Vessels Employed on British Naval Service on the Great Lakes, 1755–1875

Naval history of Canada
Royal Navy bases in Canada
Royal Canadian Navy dockyards
Military installations closed in 1813
Military installations established in 1798
1798 establishments in Upper Canada
1813 disestablishments in Upper Canada
History of shipbuilding in Ontario
Military history of the Great Lakes